Cock rock is a rock music genre.

Cock Rock may also refer to:
 Cock Rock, now renamed Rooster Rock, a column of basalt in Rooster Rock State Park, Oregon, USA
 Cock Rock, 1996 album by Diesel Boy
 Cock Rock Disco, an independent record label
 Cockermouth Rock Festival, or Cock Rock, was a grass-roots music and arts festival held on the outskirts of the town Cockermouth, Cumbria, UK.

See also
 Cock-of-the-rock, a South American bird
 Coq Roq, a Burger King advertising programme